Patricia Palinkas (née Barczi, born 1943) is credited as the first woman to play American football professionally in a league made predominantly of men. She was a holder for her husband Stephen Palinkas for the Orlando Panthers of the minor league Atlantic Coast Football League. Palinkas was the only woman to attain this distinction until Katie Hnida signed with the Fort Wayne Firehawks in 2010.

Career
Palinkas attended Northern Illinois University, but did not play football there. At the time of Mr. and Mrs. Palinkas's signing with Orlando, the team was in severe financial straits, having lost thousands of dollars running the team on a large budget. The incoming ownership group sought a way to draw fans to the gate without the big-budget talent it had relied upon in the 1960s. The publicity that came with a female football player, and the profits that could be realized by hiring a box-office draw at league minimum salary, was likely a key factor in the duo's signing.

Palinkas's first day of play was August 15, 1970, against the Bridgeport Jets, in front of roughly twelve thousand fans. On her first play, Palinkas was attacked by Jets defenseman Wally Florence, who admittedly (and unsuccessfully) attempted to "break her neck" as punishment for what he perceived to be "making folly with a man's game." Palinkas went on to appear four more times: three consecutive successful extra-point kicks, and a field goal attempt that was blocked.

After her husband injured his leg (reducing his field goal range from 40 yards to an unacceptable 25 yards) and failed to make the preseason cut, Palinkas (after surviving a threat from ACFL Commissioner Cosmo Iacavazzi to block her contract and prevent her from playing) remained the team's holder for a new kicker, Ron Miller, mainly because she was a draw at the box office; she lost interest in the game soon after the decision and was suspended shortly after the start of the season.

After being placed on the Panthers' taxi squad, Palinkas left the team, in part due to the low pay; she received $25 for each of the two preseason games in which she appeared, and was planning on demanding a greater share than the standard $100 ACFL salary had she played in any regular-season games. Palinkas was one of several Panthers players who quit the team prior to the end of the season because of salary disputes, and several of her teammates complained of not being paid at all. She held an option to return to the team in 1971 (which transferred to the Roanoke Buckskins after the Panthers suspended operations) but, because of the relocation distance and other problems she experienced during her time playing football, she let it lapse.

Palinkas, after her brief stint in professional football, returned to her home in Tampa, Florida to start a family and continue her career as a first grade teacher.

See also
 List of female American football players
 List of women firsts

References

External links
 YouTube video

Female players of American football
Living people
1953 births
Northern Illinois University alumni
American sportswomen
Players of American football from Tampa, Florida
21st-century American women